Plum Grove is an unincorporated community in Lowndes County, Mississippi.

References

Unincorporated communities in Lowndes County, Mississippi
Unincorporated communities in Mississippi